Euan Michael Ross Geddes, 3rd Baron Geddes (born 3 September 1937), is a British Conservative peer and politician and current deputy speaker of the House of Lords.

Early life
Geddes is the son of the 2nd Baron Geddes and the former Enid Mary Butler, only child of Clarence Henry Butler, of Tenterden.

He was educated at Rugby School, Warwickshire, and at Gonville and Caius College, Cambridge, where he graduated as a Bachelor of Arts in history in 1961, later promoted to Master of Arts. He was further educated at Harvard Business School in 1969. He succeeded to his father's title in 1975.

Career
Geddes served in the Royal Navy from 1956 to 1958, and became a Lieutenant-Commander in the Royal Naval Reserve. He was development manager, P&O Bulk Shipping. He was deputy manager of P&O Asia (Hong Kong) between 1975 and 1977. Since 1992, he has been chair of the Trinity College, London and since 2000 of Chrome Castle Ltd. He is further director of the Trinity College of Music and is one of the ninety hereditary peers selected to remain in the House of Lords after the House of Lords Act 1999. Since 2002 Lord Geddes has been a deputy speaker of the House of Lords.

Personal life
Lord Geddes has been married twice, first to Gillian Butler in 1966 and, after her death in 1995, to Susan Margaret Carter  in 1996. He has two children by his first wife, one daughter and one son, his heir James George Neil Geddes.

Literature

References 

1937 births
Living people
People educated at Rugby School
Alumni of Gonville and Caius College, Cambridge
Barons in the Peerage of the United Kingdom
Conservative Party (UK) hereditary peers
Harvard Business School alumni
Royal Naval Reserve personnel
Hereditary peers elected under the House of Lords Act 1999